Castellar was a comune (municipality) in the Province of Cuneo in the Italian region Piedmont, located about  southwest of Turin and about  northwest of Cuneo.

History 
Castellar was an autonomous comune up to the end of 2018; on January the 1st 2019 it was united to the neighbouring comune of Saluzzo, thus enforcing the results of a referendum held in the summer of 2018.

The comune of Castellar bordered the following municipalities: Pagno, Revello, and Saluzzo. It had the following frazioni: Regione Giardino, Regione Morra, Regione Pairunella, Regione San Guglielmo, Regione Testa Nera

Demographic evolution

References

Cities and towns in Piedmont
Frazioni of the Province of Cuneo